Not Ashamed is the fourth studio album by Australian CCM band Newsboys, released in 1992. The album was the Newsboys' first commercially successful album, with "I'm Not Ashamed" becoming a hit on Christian radio. With this album, producer Steve Taylor started co-writing many of the band's songs with Peter Furler, who also began sharing lead vocals duties with then-primary vocalist John James.

Track listing

Note
On "Where You Belong" / "Turn Your Eyes Upon Jesus" John James has the lead vocals on "Where You Belong" and Peter Furler on "Turn Your Eyes Upon Jesus". On "Boycott Hell" Steve Taylor's part is a rap.

Music videos
 "I Cannot Get You Out of My System"
 "I'm Not Ashamed"
 "Where You Belong"/"Turn Your Eyes Upon Jesus"
 "Dear Shame"

Radio singles
Note: all CCM Magazine chart information is available in the book Hot Hits CHR 1978–1997 (1997) by Jeffrey Lee Brothers

Personnel 
Newsboys
 John James – lead vocals
 Peter Furler – drums, vocals, programming
 Corey Pryor – keyboards, samples, programming
 Sean Taylor – bass, backing vocals

Additional musicians

 Dave Perkins – guitars
 Phil Madeira – Hammond organ, acoustic piano, slide guitar
 Eric Darken – percussion
 Russ Long – tambourine (7)
 John Mark Painter – Mellotron, clavinet, trumpet, bass (1, 5, 7, 8)
 Blair Masters – E-mu Emulator
 Tony Miracle – E-mu Emulator
 Danny Duncan – additional programming (2, 4, 6)
 Steve Lennox – additional programming (2, 4, 6)
 Vicki Hampton – backing vocals
 Fleming McWilliams – backing vocals on "Upon This Rock", soprano vocals on "I'm Not Ashamed"
 Steve Taylor – backing vocals, rap on "Boycott Hell," verses on "Lost the Sky Again"

Production

 Peter Furler – producer
 Steve Taylor – producer 
 Wes Campbell – executive producer
 Darrell A. Harris – executive producer
 Russ Long – engineer
 Mike Alvord – assistant engineer
 Rick Cobble – assistant engineer
 John Rogers – assistant engineer
 Shane Wilson – assistant engineer
 Quad Studios, Nashville, Tennessee – recording location
 The Bute, Nashville, Tennessee – recording location
 16th Avenue Sound, Nashville, Tennessee – recording location
 Ron Christopher – mixing
 Alan Shacklock – mixing
 Bosstown Studios, Atlanta, Georgia – mixing location
 Bob Ludwig – mastering at Masterdisk, New York City
 Toni Thigpen – creative director
 Jeff Fraizer – photography
 Griffin Norman – art direction and design for IKON

Not Ashamed: The Video
Not Ashamed: The Video is Newsboys' second video, released in late 1993. Like Boys Will Be Boyz, it also includes a bonus video of "Simple Man" from Hell Is for Wimps. The cover art was designed by Brian Dominey and photographed by Jeff Frazier. It was distributed as a NTSC VHS tape in stereo.

Track listing
 "I'm Not Ashamed"
 "I Cannot Get You Out of My System"
 "Dear Shame"
 "Where You Belong/Turn Your Eyes Upon Jesus"
 "Simple Man"
 "Other Fun Stuff"

References

Newsboys albums
1992 albums